Jeffrey Leroy Lee (born May 23, 1955) is an American former wide receiver in the National Football League. He played with the St. Louis Cardinals during the 1980 NFL season.
Mr. Jeff Lee is currently the Vice Principal in Bonifay, Florida’s  Holmes County High School. In addition to this, he is the head Athletic Director of the Holmes County High School Blue Devils.  Holmes County Jeff Lee did not play at Nebraska.

Running for Nebraska, he was the 1977 NCAA Indoor Champion for 60 yard hurdles.

References

Sportspeople from Racine, Wisconsin
Players of American football from Wisconsin
St. Louis Cardinals (football) players
American football wide receivers
Nebraska Cornhuskers football players
1955 births
Living people
Sportspeople from the Milwaukee metropolitan area
William Horlick High School alumni